The Dutch Tweede Divisie in the 1969–70 season was contested by 17 teams. sc Heerenveen won the championship and were promoted to the Eerste Divisie along with runners-up FC Wageningen.

New entrants
Relegated from the Eerste Divisie:
 FC Eindhoven
 FC Wageningen
 RBC

League standings

See also
 1969–70 Eredivisie
 1969–70 Eerste Divisie

References
Netherlands - List of final tables (RSSSF)

Tweede Divisie seasons
3
Neth